Caloptilia negundella, the boxelder leafroller, is a moth of the family Gracillariidae. The species was first described by Vactor Tousey Chambers in 1876. It is known from the Canadian province of Quebec and the US states of Colorado, Kentucky, New York, California, Maine, Ohio and Vermont.

The wingspan is about 13 mm. The base colour of the wings is brown with gold and greenish scales. Yellow spots are found on the apex of the forewing. Three black stripes of scales are found on the fringes of the hindwing. The body is brown and the head greenish.

Adults emerge in July and August and are active until winter. They then overwinter until spring to mate.

The larvae feed on Acer negundo. They mine the leaves of their host plant. The first-instar larvae make a narrow, linear mine along the underside of the leaflet. The mine crosses to the upperside to form a white spot until emerging. Final instars form a cone from the distal portion of the leaf and pupate inside.

References

External links
"Genus Caloptilia". Microleps.org. Retrieved November 15, 2020.

negundella
Moths of North America
Moths described in 1876